The women's marathon 10 kilometre competition of the swimming events at the 2019 Pan American Games was held August 4, 2019 at Laguna Bujama.

Schedule

Results

References

Swimming at the 2019 Pan American Games
2019 in women's swimming